Pik may refer to:

People 
 Pik, name used by comic creator Léo Quievreux as a musician 
 Fong Chong Pik (1924–2004), Malaysian politician
 Pik Botha (1932–2018), former South African politician
 Tzvika Pick (1949–2022), Israeli composer and singer

Places 
Shek Pik, Hong Kong
Pik Talgar, Kazakhstan
Pik Tandykul, Central Asia
Pik Uk, Kowloon, Hong Kong
Pik, Iran (disambiguation)

Other
 Pik As, a jumping horse

See also 
 PIK (disambiguation)